The 2021 TCR Italy Touring Car Championship will be the seventh season of the ITCC to run under TCR regulations and the 35rd season since the national touring car series was revived in 1987 as the Campionato Italiano Turismo.

Teams and drivers

Calendar and results

Drivers' Championship 

Scoring systems

Teams' Championship

References

External links 
 

2021 in Italian motorsport
Italy Touring Car Championship